The 2014 Atlantic Championship Series season was the second season of the revived Atlantic Championship. The series was organised by Formula Race Promotions under the sanctioning of SCCA Pro Racing. This will be the first ever season the Atlantic Championship visits the Thompson Speedway Road Course.

Drivers and teams

Race calendar and results

Championship standings

This list only contains drivers who registered for the championship.

See also
 2014 F1600 Championship Series season
 2014 F2000 Championship Series season

References

External links
 Official website

Atlantic Season 2014
Atlantic Championship seasons